Iberdrola is a Spanish multinational electric utility company based in Bilbao, Spain. Iberdrola has a workforce of around 34,000 employees serving around 31.67 million customers. Subsidiaries include Scottish Power (United Kingdom) and a significant part of Avangrid (United States), amongst others.   the largest shareholder of the company is the Qatar Investment Authority, with BlackRock and Norges Bank also holding significant interests.

Iberdrola is the second biggest producer of wind power after Ørsted by revenue and market capitalisation, and the world's third electricity utility by market capitalisation.

History

Early history 
Iberdrola was created on November 1, 1992, from the merger between Hidroeléctrica Española and Iberduero. Hidroeléctrica Española, also known as Hidrola, had started in 1907, while Iberduero arose from the merger between Hidroeléctrica Ibérica and Saltos del Duero in 1944. As of 2011 and with the integration of ScottishPower and Energy East, now renamed Iberdrola USA, the company has become a major multinational group.

The origin of Iberdrola lies in the Spanish industrialisation in the early 20th century. In 1840, American entrepreneurs founded the Hartford City Light Company, which lead to the incorporation of Energy East on the eastern seaboard of the US, which would much later become Iberdrola USA. Meanwhile, in Bilbao in 1901, Hidroeléctrica Ibérica was established by the engineer Juan de Urrutia. In 1907, Hidroeléctrica Ibérica shareholders created Hidroeléctrica Española to supply Madrid and Valencia. A decade later, Saltos del Duero was founded, opening the country's first hydroelectric facility in 1935, the Ricobayo power plant.

World War I forced the industry to seek new sources of energy and to install large distribution networks. Amid huge instability, US power companies underwent consolidation to decrease their financial uncertainty. However, the stock market crash of 1929 and the accompanying Great Depression brought many of these companies to the verge of ruin. In Spain, which had experienced a period of economic growth at the start of the 20th century, the industry suffered a severe setback in 1936 whose impact would be felt for the following two decades: the Spanish Civil War abruptly halted development, destroyed facilities and made maintaining the remaining equipment extremely difficult. In the 1940s, Spain experienced extreme difficulty in acquiring technology and materials due to international isolation and soaring prices.

Post-WWII 
In 1955, the South of Scotland Electricity Board (SSEB) came into being, paving the way for the creation of ScottishPower four decades later, in 1990. Two years after that, Hidroeléctrica Española and Iberduero merged to form Iberdrola. In the latter part of the 20th century, Iberdrola began expanding into Latin America, mainly Mexico and Brazil.

With ScottishPower and Iberdrola formed in Europe, in 1998 Energy East Corporation came into being in the US following New York State Electric & Gas's acquisition of Central Maine Power, Southern Connecticut Gas Company, Connecticut Natural Gas Company, Berkshire Gas Company and RGS Energy Group (the parent of Rochester Gas & Electric). Following the arrival of Jose Ignacio Sanchez Galan in 2001 Iberdrola began focusing on renewable energy. In 2007, the company continued its international expansion, increasing its presence in the UK and the US via the integration of ScottishPower and Energy East. Iberdrola has faced several merger attempts and made additional acquisitions:

 Attempted merger between Iberdrola and Repsol in 1997, which failed due to a lack of agreement between the companies.
 Attempted merger between Iberdrola and Repsol in 1999, which was rejected by La Caixa (Repsol's main shareholder).
 Attempted merger between Iberdrola and Endesa in 2000, which was stopped due to the conditions imposed by Spanish Prime Minister José María Aznar.
 Attempted hostile takeover bid by Gas Natural for Iberdrola in 2003, which was vetoed by Spain's National Energy Commission (Comisión Nacional de Energía, CNE).
 Acquisition of ScottishPower by Iberdrola in November 2006, which led to the integration of this company in April 2007. This gave rise to Europe's third largest utility.
 Acquisition of US company Energy East by Iberdrola in 2008.
 Acquisition of Brazilian company Elektro in 2011.
 Acquisition of US company United Illuminating in 2015.   
 Acquisition of Australian company Infigen Energy (which included the largest Wind Farm worldwide, the 1000 MW Mount James wind farm) in 2020.

Company chairpersons
Hidrola chairmen
 Lucas de Urquijo y Urrutia (1907–1910)
 José Luis de Oriol y Urigüen (1910–1911) (1936–1941)
 Fernando María de Ybarra (1911–1936)
 José María de Oriol y Urquijo (1941–1960)
 Íñigo de Oriol e Ybarra (1960–1992)

Iberduero chairmen
Pedro de Careaga y Baseabe, 2nd Count of Cadagua (?–1977)
Pedro de Areitio (1977–1981)
Manuel Gómez de Pablos (?–1992)

Iberdrola chairmen
Iñigo de Oriol e Ybarra (1992–2005)
Jose Ignacio Sanchez Galan (2005 to present)

Lines of business

Deregulated business
Iberdrola's liberalised business combines power generation and gas and electricity supply. The company had assets with combined installed capacity of 46.471 MW at the end of 2015. Iberdrola manages its production assets, comprising hydroelectric, combined-cycle gas, nuclear and co-generation plants located in 40 countries, mainly in Europe, North America and Latin America. Output in Spain: 58,076 GWh in 2013, of which 14,795 GWh were produced at hydroelectric plants. As a result, 79% of Iberdrola's production in Spain was  emission free.

Regulated business
Iberdrola provides service to more than 32.26 million people. In Spain has over 10.91 million supply points and a total distributed energy of 92,676 GWh. The TIEPI indicator for supply quality has been situated at a value of 61.8 minutes (2015). In the United Kingdom, the affiliate for the ScottishPower Group has over 3.51 million distribution clients. The volume of energy distributed has been 36.213 GWh. In the United States, Avangrid has 2.2 million power supply points of electricity and 0.99 million of gas. The volume of energy distributed has been 31.337 GWh. In Brazil, Iberdrola has distributed a total of 29.941 GWh in 2015. The number of customers has been 13.1 million.

Renewable energy business
In Q1 2021, Iberdrola reported having operating installed capacity of 55,396 MW producing a total of 42,951 GWh of electricity in the year. Its clean energy capacity increased by 13.3% to 79%.

Main subsidiaries

ScottishPower

The UK's 4th largest energy provider, ScottishPower has 5.79 million customers across the country and 7,380 employees. It has generation assets in hydro, coal, combined cycle gas and cogeneration, as well as a distribution network covering 65,000 km of underground cables and 47,000 km of overhead lines. ScottishPower is involved in smart grid projects in Glasgow and Liverpool, and provides charging points as a member of the Glasgow consortium which is developing an electric vehicles project. The installed capacity in the United Kingdom has reached 6,342 MW and production has been 19,936 GWh in 2013.

Iberdrola USA

Iberdrola USA, which became part of the group in September 2008, distributes electricity and gas to 2.44 million customers in the states of Maine and New York. It has offices located in its principal distribution centres in the two states. In New York, the business is shared by two operating subsidiaries – New York State Electric & Gas (NYSEG) and Rochester Gas and Electric (RG&E) – both headquartered in Rochester. In Maine, Central Maine Power (CMP) has headquarters in Augusta. NYSEG serves 878,000 electricity customers and 261,000 natural gas customers across more than 40% of upstate New York, whereas RG&E serves 367,000 electricity customers and 303,000 natural gas customers in nine counties around the city of Rochester. CMP is the largest energy supplier in Maine, serving over 600,000 customers.

Iberdrola USA promotes important infrastructure projects in both Maine and New York. In Maine, CMP began construction in September 2010 of the Maine Power Reliability Program (MPRP), a $1.4 billion upgrade of the state's transmission network which will also improve grid connections to Canada. It also began the roll-out of a smart meter installation plan for 625,000 customers in Maine. In New York, important infrastructure projects have been undertaken at Ithaca and Corning Valley.

In 2015 Iberdrola USA merged with UIL Holdings (parent of Connecticut's United Illuminating and other companies) to become Iberdrola-controlled Avangrid.

Iberdrola Ingeniería
With projects in more than 30 countries throughout Europe, Asia, Africa and North and South America, Iberdrola Ingeniería and Construcción's services include engineering, supply, construction and commissioning, turnkey projects and operational support. In the area of R&D, is developing the Iter project.

Iberdrola Inmobiliaria
Iberdrola Inmobiliaria offers a range a real estate products, with a focus on residential property, holiday homes, offices, factory premises and shopping centres.

Assets in Spain

Iberdrola also owns hydroelectric plants, especially in the Duero river basin (provided by Iberduero) and the Tajo and Segura river basins, etc. (provided by Hidroeléctrica Española).

Construction is finished on the 848 MW La Muela plant (at Cortes de Pallás, Valencia) and on the 175 MW San Esteban II plan, on the Sil river. The San Pedro II project has started its construction.
See also: Saltos del Duero.

Combined cycle plants
 C. T. de Castejón 2, in Castejón (Navarre), with 386 MW.
 C. T. de Castellón, in Castellón, with two units with a combined 1,650 MW.
 C. T. de Santurce, in Santurce (Vizcaya), with 402 MW.
 C. T. Tarragona Power, in Tarragona, with 424 MW.
 C. T. de Arcos de la Frontera, in Arcos de la Frontera (Cádiz), with two groups with a combined 1,613 MW.
 C. T. Bahía de Bizkaia, in Ciérvana (Vizcaya), which is operated jointly with three other operators (EVE, Repsol YPF and BP with 25% each), of 780 MW.
 C. T. de Aceca, in Villaseca de la Sagra (Toledo), of 391 MW.
 C. T. de Escombreras, in Cartagena (Murcia), with 831 MW.

Nuclear plants
Iberdrola operates the following five nuclear plants individually or jointly with other companies: 
 Almaraz Nuclear Power Plant (1983/1984)
 Trillo Nuclear Power Plant (1988)
 Cofrentes Nuclear Power Plant (1984)
 Vandellòs II (1988)
 Ascó II (1986)

Thermal plants
Iberdrola also owns some conventional thermal plants, mostly coal-fired, although it can also use fuel oil and gas oil. Two of these plants are:
 C. T. de Velilla, in Velilla del Río Carrión (Palencia), with two units, one of 148 MW and one of 350 MW, in operation since 1964 and 1984, respectively.
 C. T. de Lada, in Langreo (Asturias), which had as many as four units, but now only has one of 350 MW, put into operation in 1981.

Renewable energy

Headquartered in Valencia (Paseo de la Alameda), the Iberdrola Renovables subsidiary had been listed on the stock exchange from December 2007 until July 2011, when Iberdrola decided to re-acquire the minority shares and integrate it into the parent company.

In Q1 2021, Iberdrola reported having operating installed capacity of 55,396 MW producing a total of 42,951 GWh of electricity in the year. Its clean energy capacity increased by 13.3% to 79%.

Iberdola reported to have increased its investments in renewables with 29% and has 8,700 MW of renewable energy under construction. It plans to build 78,000 MW until 2025.

Major assets

Renewable Energy Operations Centres  CORE (Toledo, Portland and Glasgow)

Iberdrola's Renewable Energy Operations Centres (CORE for its initials in Spanish) in Toledo, Portland and Glasgow control all Iberdrola's renewables facilities and its related substations worldwide. Iberdrola's first CORE was set up in Toledo in 2003, with the other two coming on stream since.

The Whitelee Wind Farm (Glasgow, Scotland) 

With initial installed capacity of 322 MW, it is currently being enlarged to 539 MW. The complex is situated south of Glasgow and covers an area of 55 square kilometres, the same as that occupied by Glasgow itself.

The El Andévalo wind farm (Huelva, Spain)

The El Andévalo wind farm, which was commissioned in 2010, is the largest wind power facility in Spain and continental Europe. It has installed capacity of 292 MW and is located between the towns of El Almendro, Alosno, San Silvestre and Puebla de Guzmán in the south of Huelva province. To transfer the power generated by these wind farms and connect them to the transmission grid, Iberdrola has built a new 120-kilometre line between Spain and Portugal, which means this complex occupies a key strategic position in the power interconnections between the two countries.

Peñascal Wind Power Project (Texas, US)

The Peñascal wind farm is the largest facility operated by the company worldwide, with installed capacity of 404 MW. Located in Kenedy County, Texas, its innovative features include a radar that detects the arrival of large flocks of migratory birds and shuts down the turbines if visibility conditions represent a danger.

 Núñez de Balboa solar plant (Badajoz Province, Spain)

The 500-megawatt Núñez de Balboa photovoltaic facility entered its testing phase in January 2020.

See also
Jose Ignacio Sanchez Galan
Wind power in Spain
María Antonia Herrero

References

External links

Press articles
We need a co-ordinated European energy policy and an end to states protecting their own interests
Maine chooses Iberdrola to build gas pipeline to state properties
Iberdrola Begins Work On Its First German Offshore Wind Farm, Plans 11 GW Of Offshore Wind In Europe
Iberdrola joint venture bags $182 million investment for Brazilian wind farms
Iberdrola USA Foundation and Fundacion Iberdrola Scholarship Program Completes Successful First Year
Iberdrola invests 1.6 bln eur in German wind farm
Wind energy in Poland: Iberdrola opens a wind farm
Iberdrola prices 750 mln euro 2017 bond
Iberdrola USA Subsidiaries Recognized for Outstanding Sandy Recovery Efforts
Iberdrola sells 1 billion euro bond

 
Electric power companies of Spain
Nuclear power companies of Spain
Basque companies
Multinational companies headquartered in Spain
Energy companies established in 1992
Non-renewable resource companies established in 1992
Companies listed on the Madrid Stock Exchange
Companies in the Euro Stoxx 50
IBEX 35
Spanish brands
Spanish companies established in 1992
Organisations based in Bilbao